Rear Admiral David Charles Wells,  (19 November 1918 – 27 September 1983) was a senior commander in the Royal Australian Navy, who commanded ANZUK in Singapore from its formation in November 1971 until 1973.

Naval career
Wells entered the Royal Australian Navy's College at the Flinders Naval Depot in January 1933, aged 14. Almost four years later, he was awarded maximum time towards early promotion to lieutenant) as well as prizes for excellence in maths, physics and chemistry.

He earned the Otto Albert prize for seamanship, and the King's Gold Medal for most exemplary conduct, performance of duty and good influence among his peers. Wells was promoted to midshipman in January 1937.

From 1970–71 Rear Admiral Wells served as the Deputy Chief of Naval Staff in Canberra, in recognition of which he was appointed a Commander of the Order of the British Empire in 1971. Wells commanded the tri-nation and tri-service ANZUK force based in Singapore from 1971 to 1973 and, on his return to Australia, was posted as Flag Officer Commanding HM Australian Fleet from February 1974 to November 1975, after which he retired.

Last years and death
Wells died at Coolah, New South Wales on 27 September 1983, aged 64.

References

|-

|-

|-

1918 births
1983 deaths
Military personnel from New South Wales
Graduates of the Royal College of Defence Studies
Australian Commanders of the Order of the British Empire
Australian military personnel of the Vietnam War
Royal Australian Navy personnel of World War II
People from New South Wales
Royal Australian Navy admirals